Tullinge Church is a church building in Tullinge, Botkyrka, Sweden.

See also 
 Tumba Church

Churches in Stockholm